Del Norte Unified School District is a public school district serving Del Norte County, California, United States. It has an enrollment of 3,679 students across eleven schools: eight elementary schools, a middle school, and two high schools. The superintendent is Jeff Harris. Del Norte High School and Crescent Elk Middle School, within the district, are among the few schools that provide instruction in the Yurok language.

Its attendance boundary is the same as the borders of the county.

Demographics 
As of 2016-17, the district had a total enrollment of 3,679 students with 160.47 classroom teachers , for a student–teacher ratio of 22.93. Of those 3,679 students, 65.7 percent of them qualified for free or reduced lunch under the National School Lunch Act. 7.6 percent of students were enrolled in English as a second or foreign language classes. The district is primarily White (63 percent), with small Native American (7 percent), Asian (3 percent), Black (2 percent) and Multiracial (6 percent) minorities. 19 percent of students are Hispanic or Latino. As of 2018, the district has a very high chronic absentee rate, 20.9 percent.

Schools

High schools 
 Del Norte High School
 Sunset High School

Middle schools 
 Crescent Elk Middle School

Elementary schools 
 Bess Maxwell Elementary School
 Joe Hamilton Elementary School
 Margaret Keating Elementary School
 Mary Peacock Elementary School
 Mountain Elementary School
 PIne Grove Elementary School
 Redwood Elementary School
 Smith River Elementary School

References

External links
 

School districts in California